Autocharis miltosoma is a moth in the family Crambidae. It is found in Australia, where it has been recorded in Queensland.

References

Moths described in 1937
Odontiinae
Moths of Australia